Nurses Improving Care for Healthsystem Elders (NICHE) is a program of the Hartford Institute for Geriatric Nursing at New York University College of Nursing, that works to achieve systematic nursing change to benefit hospitalized older patients.   Founded in 1992, NICHE has evolved into a national geriatric nursing program comprising over 620 hospitals in more than 40 states as well as parts of Canada.

Unlike similar programs, NICHE does not prescribe how institutions should modify geriatric care; rather, it provides the materials and services necessary to stimulate a change in the culture of healthcare facilities to achieve patient-centered care for older adults.

History 
NICHE is based on 1981 Geriatric Resource Nurse (GRN) model, in which unit-based GRN nurses provided consultation to other staff nurses leading improved care of older adults by creating standard protocols for common geriatric problems and enhancing the expertise of staff nurses. Initially a part of the Hartford Foundation's Hospital Outcomes Program for the Elderly (HOPE) multi-site initiative, after a series of funds for the project, the NICHE program was officially created in 1992. Through a rigorous screening-process using the Geriatric Institutional Assessment Profile (GIAP), an instrument designed to help hospitals analyze the needs of their elderly patients and determine gaps in geriatric care provision, the NICHE Program has become an integral part of the Hartford Institute since 1996.

In 2006, Hartford Institute received funding from Atlantic Philanthropies to develop a business plan to expand its organizational capacity, improve dramatically the program's "toolkit"—particularly its measurement and reporting capacity—and initiate outreach to accelerate adoption of this program by additional hospitals.

The NICHE Program 
The NICHE Program provides the principles, resources and tools to stimulate a change in the culture of health care facilities and achieve patient-centered care for older adult patients. It is affordable and comprehensive, and benefits hospitals in a number of ways:
 Improved clinical outcomes
 Positive fiscal results
 Enhanced nursing competencies
 Community recognition
 Greater patient, family, and staff satisfaction
 
NICHE provides hospitals with:
 State-of-the-art training, tools and resources including an interactive 24/7 E-learning center
 Project management support/mentoring for NICHE-based hospital initiatives
 Evidence-based clinical protocols that address "never events," Joint Commission compliance and other regulatory imperatives
 Geriatric Institutional Assessment Profile (GIAP) tool
 Shared information, knowledge, and expertise

References 

 Fulmer, T. (2001). The geriatric resource nurse: A model of caring for older patients. American Journal of Nursing, 102, 62.
 www.nicheprogram.org

Geriatrics
Medical education in the United States